The Downtown St. Petersburg Historic District is a U.S. historic district (designated as such on April 30, 2004) located in St. Petersburg, Florida. The district is bounded by 5th Avenue N, Beach Drive NE, Central Avenue (St. Petersburg, Florida)Central Avenue, and 9th Street N. It contains 367 historic buildings and 7 objects.

Gallery

References

External links
 Pinellas County listings at National Register of Historic Places

National Register of Historic Places in Pinellas County, Florida
Geography of St. Petersburg, Florida
Historic districts on the National Register of Historic Places in Florida
Tourist attractions in St. Petersburg, Florida
2004 establishments in Florida